Taipingqiao station is a subway station on Line 19 of the Beijing Subway. The station opened on 30 July 2022.

Name
The station was previously known as Jinrongjie station during construction. However, the metro station is actually located outside the core area of Beijing Financial Street, so the metro station was renamed to Taipingqiao station to consistent with the nearby Beijing Bus station which also called Taipingqiao.

Platform Layout
The station has an underground island platform.

Exits
There are 2 exits, lettered A and D. Exit D is accessible as it provides lift access.

References

External links

Beijing Subway stations in Xicheng District
Railway stations in China opened in 2022